Thuban, with Bayer designation Alpha Draconis or α Draconis, is a binary star system in the northern constellation of Draco. A relatively inconspicuous star in the night sky of the Northern Hemisphere, it is historically significant as having been the north pole star from the 4th to 2nd millennium BC.

Johann Bayer gave Thuban the designation Alpha and placed it as the only member of his secundae magnitude class in Draco, although its current apparent magnitude of 3.65 means it is 3.7 times fainter than the brightest star in the constellation, Gamma Draconis (Eltanin), which Bayer placed in his tertiae magnitude class although its current apparent magnitude is 2.24.

Nomenclature
α Draconis (Latinised to Alpha Draconis) is the star's Bayer designation.

The traditional name Thuban is derived from the Arabic word   ('large snake' (e.g. a python or a legendary draconian serpent)). It is sometimes known as the Dragon's Tail and as Adib . In 2016, the International Astronomical Union organized a Working Group on Star Names (WGSN) to catalog and standardize proper names for stars. The WGSN's first bulletin of July 2016 included a table of the first two batches of names approved by the WGSN; which included Thuban for this star. It is now so entered in the IAU Catalog of Star Names.

Visibility 
Given good viewing conditions, Thuban is relatively easy to spot in the night sky, due to its location in relation to the Big Dipper (aka the Plough) asterism of Ursa Major. While it is well known that the two outer stars of the 'dipper' point to the modern-day pole star Polaris, it is less well known that the two inner stars, Phecda and Megrez, point to Thuban, just 15 degrees of arc from Megrez. Thuban is not bright enough to be viewed from badly light-polluted areas.

Pole star 

Due to the precession of Earth's rotational axis, Thuban was the naked-eye star closest to the north pole from 3942 BC, when it superseded Tau Herculis as the pole star, until 1793 BC, when it was superseded by Kappa Draconis. It was closest to the pole in 2830 BC, when it was less than 10 arcminutes away from the pole. It remained within one degree of celestial north for nearly 200 years afterwards, and even 900 years after its closest approach, was just 5° off the pole. Thuban was considered the pole star until about 1800 BC, when the much brighter Beta Ursae Minoris (Kochab) began to approach the pole as well.

After moving nearly 47° off the pole by 10,000 AD, Thuban will gradually move back toward the north celestial pole.

Binary system

Thuban is a single-lined spectroscopic binary. For a long time, only the primary star could be detected in the spectrum. The radial velocity variations of the stars can be measured and the pair have a somewhat eccentric orbit of 51.4 days. The secondary is a main-sequence star slightly cooler than the primary, with an A1 spectral class.

The secondary star was detected in high spatial resolution observations using the Navy Precision Optical Interferometer. The secondary star is 1.8 magnitudes (at 700 nm) fainter than the primary star and was detected at separations ranging from 6.2 to 2.6 milliarcseconds. Eclipses were detected using data obtained with the Transiting Exoplanet Survey Satellite (TESS). The presence of eclipses places Thuban into the class of binaries known as eclipsing binaries.

Properties 

Thuban has a spectral class of A0III, indicating its similarity to Vega in temperature and spectrum, but more luminous and more massive. It has been used as an MK spectral standard for the A0III type.

Thuban is not a main-sequence star; it has now ceased hydrogen fusion in its core. That makes it a white giant star, being 120 times more luminous than the Sun. It is 300 light-years away and its brightness is only decreased by 0.003 of a magnitude by intervening gas and dust.

Conspiracy theory
According to British conspiracy theorist David Icke, Alpha Draconis is the origin of blood-drinking, shape-shifting reptilians who lurk in underground bases on Earth and plot against humanity (with the aid of powerful figures including royalty).

References

External links 
 Jim Kaler's Stars, University of Illinois: THUBAN (Alpha Draconis)
 NASA's: History of Precession
 : Precession of the Equinoxes

A-type giants
Suspected variables
Spectroscopic binaries

Draco (constellation)
Draconis, Alpha
Durchmusterung objects
Draconis, 11
123299
068756
5291
Northern pole stars
Stars named from the Arabic language